Heptynes are alkynes with one triple bond and the molecular formula C7H12.

The isomers are:
 1-Heptyne
 2-Heptyne
 3-Heptyne

Alkynes